The Canadian Heritage Rivers System (CHRS) is a joint program administered by the federal, provincial and territorial governments to conserve and protect the best examples of Canada's river heritage, to give them national recognition, and to encourage the public to enjoy and appreciate them. It is a cooperative program of the governments of Canada, nine provinces, and the three territories. A 14-member national board, created under the Parks Canada Agency Act, administers the program and approves the designation of specific rivers.

History
The Canadian Heritage Rivers System was established in 1984. The first Canadian Heritage River was the French River in Ontario, designated in 1986.

By 1996 there were 29 designated rivers.

Quebec withdrew its participation in 2006.  There are currently 39 designated and three nominated rivers; with rivers  designated in every province and territory except for Quebec.

Designated rivers
The rivers currently designated as a Canadian Heritage River are:

Nominated rivers

Quebec participation

Quebec is the only province or territory to not have a designated or nominated river. The province withdrew its participation in the Canadian Heritage Rivers System in 2006.

Quebec's lack of participation affects nominations and designations for rivers shared with other provinces. In 1998, the New Brunswick portion of the Restigouche River was designated (as "Upper Restigouche"), while the Quebec portion was not. The Ottawa River was nominated in 2007 and designated in 2016, but only the Ontario portion of the river was included. The federal government says it's working with Quebec "to establish recognition of the heritage value of Quebec's stretch of the Outaouais River".

See also
 American Heritage Rivers, America's counterpart to the Canadian Heritage Rivers System

References

External links
 Canadian Heritage River Website

 Canadian Heritage Rivers System
1984 establishments in Canada